Palaiseau is one of the four RER B stations in the city of Palaiseau.

Réseau Express Régional stations
Railway stations in Essonne
Railway stations in France opened in 1854